In Greek Mythology, Antibrote (Ancient Greek: Ἀντιβρότη) was one of the Amazons, a race of warrior-women. She was one of Penthesilea's twelve companions at Troy.

Mythology 
Antibrote was killed in the Trojan War by the hero Achilles, according to Quintus Smyrnaeus's Fall of Troy:

Notes

References 

 Quintus Smyrnaeus, The Fall of Troy translated by Way. A. S. Loeb Classical Library Volume 19. London: William Heinemann, 1913. Online version at theio.com
 Quintus Smyrnaeus, The Fall of Troy. Arthur S. Way. London: William Heinemann; New York: G.P. Putnam's Sons. 1913. Greek text available at the Perseus Digital Library

Amazons of the Trojan war